Ron Reiffel (15 March 1932 – 30 December 2018) was an Australian rules footballer who played with Richmond in the Victorian Football League (VFL).

Reiffel made six appearances for Richmond, three in 1951 and another three in the 1952 VFL season.

He was the son of Melbourne and South Melbourne player Lou Reiffel. His own son, Paul Reiffel, is an Australian cricket umpire and former Test cricketer. A granddaughter, Sarah Ashmore, plays netball with the Melbourne Phoenix.

Reiffel was the curator of the Richmond Football Club Museum.

References

1932 births
2018 deaths
Australian rules footballers from Victoria (Australia)
Richmond Football Club players